"The World Needs a Melody" is a song written by Red Lane, Johnny Slate and Larry Henley and originally recorded by The Carter Family together with Johnny Cash. It is part of the 1972 Carter Family album Travelin' Minstrel Band.

Released in August 1972 as a single (Columbia 4-45679, with "A Bird with Broken Wings Can't Fly" by The Carter Family on the opposite side), the song reached number 35 on U.S. Billboard country chart for the week of November 4.

Track listing

Charts

Cover versions 
 1973: The New Kingston Trio on the album The World Needs a Melody

References

External links 
 "The World Needs a Melody" on the Johnny Cash official website

Carter Family songs
Johnny Cash songs
Songs written by Red Lane
Songs written by Johnny Slate
Songs written by Larry Henley
Song recordings produced by Larry Butler (producer)
1972 songs
1972 singles
Columbia Records singles